Fernando Manuel de Jesus Santos (born 17 March 1973), known as Nandinho, is a Portuguese retired footballer who played as a right winger, currently a manager.

He amassed Primeira Liga totals of 257 matches and 41 goals over 11 seasons, representing mainly in the competition Gil Vicente (four years).

Playing career
Born in Porto, Nandinho played amateur football until the age of 22, signing with Primeira Liga club S.C. Salgueiros in 1995 from SC Castêlo da Maia. He scored a career-best 13 goals in 30 games in his third season, helping his team to the eighth position.

Subsequently, Nandinho signed for S.L. Benfica – against which he had previously scored – as Graeme Souness was the manager. As several British players were brought in, he was eventually deemed surplus to requirements, finishing his debut campaign with farm team F.C. Alverca, where he netted a hat-trick in a 3–2 home win against Sporting CP on 17 April 1999.

Nandinho joined Vitória S.C. in summer 1999, being rarely played by Paulo Autuori but featuring more under new coach Álvaro Magalhães. He retired in June 2007 at 34, after spells with Gil Vicente F.C. in the top flight and Leixões S.C. in the Segunda Liga.

Coaching career
On 28 May 2015, after several years in charge of the youth sides, Nandinho was chosen as José Mota's successor at the helm of Gil's first team, recently relegated from the top division. He left the post on 11 May of the following year, taking over at F.C. Famalicão on 17 October.

Nandinho resigned on 2 April 2017, with the club near the relegation places in the second tier. He returned to Gil Vicente in the 2018 off-season, achieving promotion without playing and being relieved of his duties.

Nandinho first moved abroad on 16 October 2019, replacing the dismissed Esteban Navarro at UD Almería B. The following 26 June, he was named assistant manager of the first team until the end of the season, with Mário Silva becoming the head coach, but returned to his previous role on 27 July as Silva was dismissed.

On 24 August 2022, Nandinho was hired by B-SAD, who had dismissed José Maria Pratas three games into the second-division campaign. He was dismissed the following 31 January, having taken 15 points in 14 games for the 16th-placed team, despite awaiting the quarter-finals of the Taça de Portugal.

Managerial statistics

References

External links

1973 births
Living people
Portuguese footballers
Footballers from Porto
Association football wingers
Primeira Liga players
Liga Portugal 2 players
CD Candal players
S.C. Salgueiros players
S.L. Benfica footballers
F.C. Alverca players
Vitória S.C. players
Gil Vicente F.C. players
Leixões S.C. players
Portugal under-21 international footballers
Portuguese football managers
Liga Portugal 2 managers
Gil Vicente F.C. managers
F.C. Famalicão managers
Belenenses SAD managers
Tercera División managers
UD Almería B managers
Portuguese expatriate football managers
Expatriate football managers in Spain
Portuguese expatriate sportspeople in Spain